Raymond L. Gandolf (April 2, 1930 – December 2, 2015) was an American sports broadcaster on CBS who went on to become co-anchor of the historical series Our World for ABC Television, along with reporting from four Olympic Games.

Life 
Gandolf was born in Norwalk, Ohio on April 2, 1930. He had a wife, Blanche Cholet, and five daughters. He earned a B.S. degree in Speech from the University of Illinois in Champaign, Illinois. 

Gandolf, together with Linda Ellerbee and Richard Gerdau, won a writing Emmy Award in 1987 for an Our World episode. He also earned a Peabody Awards and duPont Award. 

Gandolf died in Manhattan at the age of 85 on December 2, 2015.

References

External links

1930 births
2015 deaths
People from Norwalk, Ohio
American sports announcers
Motorsport announcers
American television news anchors
American male journalists